The Beishan Underground Research Laboratory (also shortened Beishan URL) is a deep geological repository for the disposal of spent nuclear fuel, currently under construction in the Gobi Desert, in Gansu, China. The facility is expected to take 7 years to build, with a planned operating period of 50 years, and cost approximately 2.7 billion yuan (US$400 million).

See also 
 Radioactive waste
 Deep geological repository
 Nuclear power in China

References 

Radioactive waste repositories
Nuclear power in China